Charlie is a historical drama mini-series broadcast on RTÉ Television. The show premiered on 4 January 2015 at 21:30 on RTÉ One and on RTÉ Player.	
The show depicts the central figure of Irish politics in the 1980s, Charles Haughey. This drama is based on real events, exploring the emergence of modern Ireland through the rise and fall of Charles Haughey.

Plot
The drama is set in democratic Ireland in the late 1970s. Charlie Haughey is the Taoiseach of Ireland, (portrayed by Aidan Gillen) and his loyal servant, P.J Mara (portrayed by Tom Vaughan-Lawlor). The main focus of the drama is on Haughey and his circle, and the drama largely remains true to life while capturing the excitement and menace that was in the air.

Episodes

Cast
 Aidan Gillen as Charles Haughey
 Tom Vaughan-Lawlor as P. J. Mara
 Lucy Cohu as Terry Keane
 Peter O'Meara as Brian Lenihan Snr
 Risteárd Cooper as Dermot Nally
 Gavin O'Connor as Seán Doherty 
 Marcus Lamb as Des O'Malley 
 Edward MacLiam as Ray McSharry 
 Peter Gowen as George Colley 
 Frankie McCafferty as Des Traynor
 Fergal McElherron as Albert Reynolds
 John Connors as Jimmy 
 Jody O'Neill as Geraldine Kennedy
 Rory Nolan as Charlie McCreevy 
 Gus McDonagh as Bertie Ahern 
 Sinead Watters as Jacinta
 Frances Tomelty as Sarah Haughey 
 Laurence Kinlan as Tony Gregory 
 Andrew Stanley as Gallagher 
 David Herlihy as Ray Burke
Fíonna Hewitt Twamley as Philomena

References

2015 Irish television series debuts
2015 Irish television series endings
Charles Haughey
Cultural depictions of Taoisigh
Irish political television series
RTÉ original programming
Television series by Banijay